Prekybos miestelis Urmas (abbr. Urmas or Urmo bazė) is the third largest marketplace in the Lithuania 90,000 m2 (970,000 sq ft). Urmas is in Kaunas. Urmas has over 2000 several shops. Many individual sellers. Urmas is more of a traditional marketplace than shopping mall.

See also 
 List of shopping malls in Lithuania

External links 
 Website (lt, en)

References

Shopping malls in Kaunas
Commercial buildings completed in 1992